Từ Đạo Hạnh (1072-1116) also thánh Láng, was a Vietnamese monk who lived at the Thầy Temple near modern Hanoi. Various folk legends are told about his life and powers. Today when puppeteers perform during the Thay Pagoda Festival, on the seventh day of the third lunar month, they honor Tu Dao Hanh as their founder and patron deity.

References

1072 births
1116 deaths
Lý dynasty Buddhist monks
Deified Vietnamese people
Vietnamese gods